The State Games of America is a biennial amateur multi-sport event held in North America.  It is organized by the National Congress of State Games.  Athletes qualify for the Games by earning a medal in their respective State Games in the previous two years.  Typically, over 12,000 athletes compete in the Games each time they are held.

History

Sports contested
In 2011, athletes participated in 24 different sports in San Diego, California:

 Archery
 Badminton
 Baseball
 Basketball
 BMX
 Bowling
 Figure Skating
 Gymnastics
 Judo
 Jr. Lifeguards
 Karate
 Power Lifting

 Skateboarding
 Soccer
 Softball (Girls Fast Pitch)
 Surfing
 Swimming
 Synchronised swimming
 Table Tennis
 Taekwondo
 Track and Field
 Water Polo
 Weightlifting
 Wrestling

References

External links 
 
 

Multi-sport events in the United States
United States State
Senior sports competitions
Under-20 sports competitions
North American youth sports competitions
Youth sport in the United States
Children's sport
Recurring sporting events established in 1999
1999 establishments in the United States